The China Ditch in Douglas County, in the U.S. state of Oregon, was a  canal built in part by Chinese laborers to supply water for the hydraulic mining of gold. The Myrtle Creek Consolidated Hydraulic Gold Mining and Manufacturing Company began purchasing land for the ditch in 1890 and was bankrupt by 1894. Portions of the ditch, which carried water from Little River to North Myrtle Creek, remain visible, and an  section is listed on the National Register of Historic Places.

The Bureau of Land Management maintains a driving loop and hiking trail for touring the ditch and its works.

History 

Many of the homesteaders in the area had been drawn west in the California gold rush and later moved north to begin farming. When gold was discovered in Douglas County, Oregon, in the 1860s, a number of residents returned to mining. By 1890, two large hydraulic mining machines, or "giants", were operating in the area. These machines used high-pressure jets of water to dislodge sediments, but were only functional for about three months each winter, when sufficient water was available.

Survey and construction 

After surveyors employed by the company determined that the project was feasible, 80 men began construction, and by early winter they had completed  of the ditch. The company's president, L. W. Brown, a Eugene physician, said the ditch would eventually provide irrigation water to prune orchards in the region and would transport timber to a sawmill in Myrtle Creek, in addition to supplying water for mining.

In June 1891, the company hired 100 Chinese laborers to extend the ditch and tap four additional creeks, giving the construction its name. As part of this work, a  tunnel was constructed through the mountain to connect the new supplies to the existing ditch.  This additional construction allowed three giants to operate around the clock by the end of that year.

By the time of late spring of 1892, there were still  of the ditch to construct. To aid in the process, timber was produced temporarily and water was directed around the rocky hillsides. A fourth giant later made its appearance in April 1893.

Debts and dissolution 

On June 1, 1893, the glory days of the company began to come to an end when the county Circuit Court issued a writ of attachment against it. In the following days, other parties were granted writs totaling $4,420 in unpaid wages and $6,000 in other debts. An injunction was issued against the sale of the property or company stock by the ownership, and the county sheriff was ordered to guard the property until the cases could be resolved.

Sheriff Dillard decided that it was better to clean out the gravel in the sluices rather than guard the property around the clock. The company was accused of salting the placers and of hiring more men than necessary for appearances. On July 4, 1893, the court ruled for the miners, causing the company to shut down. On October 19, 1894, the company's property, mining claims, and the ditch were sold for $7,691.

The China Ditch was officially entered into the National Register of Historic Places on May 22, 1991.

See also
National Register of Historic Places listings in Douglas County, Oregon

References

External links

Canals in Oregon
Mining in Oregon
National Register of Historic Places in Douglas County, Oregon
Bureau of Land Management areas in Oregon
Chinese-American history
Canals on the National Register of Historic Places in Oregon